The Brantford Alexanders were a junior ice hockey team in the Ontario Major Junior Hockey League and Ontario Hockey League from 1978 to 1984. The team was based in Brantford, Ontario, Canada.

History
The Hamilton Fincups were relocated in 1978 becoming the Brantford Alexanders. The OMJHL junior team took the name of the OHA senior team which had played for two years prior, which in themselves were named for Brantford's most famous former resident, telephone pioneer Alexander Graham Bell. After two years in the OMJHL, the league changed names to the OHL and the Alexanders played four more seasons in Brantford, before moving back to Hamilton as the Steelhawks.

The Alexanders made the playoffs for five straight years after missing out its first year in Brantford. The team narrowly missed out on winning its division in 1980–81 by a single point.

Brantford developed close rivalries with the London Knights and the Niagara Falls Flyers. Their playoff nemeses were the Windsor Spitfires and the Sault Ste. Marie Greyhounds. Two years in a row they were eliminated by the Spitfires, followed by three years in a row at the hands of the Greyhounds.

The Brantford Alexanders also had an official theme song recorded by County Line, called "Cowboys of the Ice".

There have been 29 alumni of the Alexanders to play in the NHL. In 1982–83, Dave Gagner was awarded the Bobby Smith Trophy for the OHA's Scholastic Player of the Year.

Coaches

NHL alumni

Season-by-season results

Regular season

Playoffs
1978–1979 Out of playoffs.
1979–1980 Defeated Toronto Marlboros 4 games to 0 in quarter-finals. Lost to Windsor Spitfires 4 games to 3 in semi-finals.
1980–1981 Lost to Windsor Spitfires 8 points to 4 in division semi-finals
1981–1982 Defeated London Knights 6 points to 2 in first round. Lost to S.S. Marie Greyhounds 8 points to 6 in quarter-finals.
1982–1983 Defeated London Knights 6 points to 0 in first round. Lost to S.S. Marie Greyhounds 8 points to 2 in quarter-finals.
1983–1984 Earned first round bye. Lost to S.S. Marie Greyhounds 8 points to 4 in quarter-finals.

Arena
The Brantford Alexanders played home games at the Brantford Civic Centre from 1978 to 1984. The OHL All-Star game was hosted here in 1982.

Brantford Civic Centre - The OHL Arena & Travel Guide

Sport in Brantford
Defunct Ontario Hockey League teams
1978 establishments in Ontario
1984 disestablishments in Ontario
Ice hockey clubs established in 1978
Sports clubs disestablished in 1984